Bocaue, officially the Municipality of Bocaue, is a 1st class municipality in the province of Bulacan, Philippines. According to the 2020 census, it has a population of 141,412 people.

With the continuous expansion of Metro Manila, the municipality is now part of Manila's built-up area which reaches San Ildefonso in its northernmost part. The Bocaue River runs through most of the town.

Among its tourist attractions are a town museum located near the municipality's center and the town's river festival celebrated on the first Sunday of every July. The river festival is in commemoration of the Holy Cross of Wawa, believed to be miraculous by the town's predominantly Roman Catholic population.

Etymology
The town's name comes from the Old Tagalog word "Bukawe", which refers to a type of long bamboo (Schyzostachyum lima).

History
Bocaue was first established by Franciscan missionaries as a barrio and visita of Meycauayan in 1582 and as a town on April 11, 1606, under the advocacy of San Martin de Tours. It was the first town to be granted independence from the old Meycauayan that was then a very large town comprising the present territories of Meycauayan City, Marilao, Santa Maria, San Jose del Monte City, Obando, and Valenzuela City.

After the Philippine–American War, the Philippine Commission was established, part of whose functions was the reorganization of Philippine municipalities and provinces. In 1903, Bulacan province reduced the number of towns from 26 to 19. The town of Balagtas was annexed to Bocaue, which later regained its independence and was reestablished as a town in 1911.

During the Bocaue River Festival of July 2, 1993, around 500 people rode the "floating pagoda" for the Holy Cross of Wawa way beyond the boat's capacity and caused the boat to sink, killing more than two hundred people. Despite the lives lost, no one has been made accountable for the tragedy. This incident became known as the Bocaue Pagoda Tragedy.

On the morning of December 31, 2007, ten fireworks stores burned in Barangay Turo, causing a series of explosions within the area and injuring 7 persons.

Geography
It is at the mid-southwestern portion of Bulacan.

The town is bounded on the north by the municipality of Balagtas and a portion of the municipality of Santa Maria; by the municipalities of Marilao and Obando on the south; a larger portion of Santa Maria on the east; a portion of the municipality of Bulakan on the extreme southwestern side; and a portion of Balagtas on the western side.

Bocaue is traversed by the Bocaue River, a continuation of the confluence of Santa Maria River and San Jose River and a few other minor rivers and creeks, all of which are distributaries of the Angat drainage basin. The main source of Angat River and the Angat drainage basin, as well as their distributaries, is the Sierra Madre mountain range. Along these rivers are many man-made fish ponds used for raising and farming fish like bangus and tilapia.

Bocaue was once part of the 2nd district of Bulacan along with Balagtas, Guiguinto, and Pandi. It was moved to the 5th district along with Balagtas, Guiguinto, and Pandi.

Barangays
Bocaue is politically subdivided into 19 barangays.

Climate

Demographics

Religion

The St Martin of Tours Church of Bocaue, otherwise known as The Diocesan Shrine of Bocaue, is one of the oldest churches in the province of Bulacan. The reputed Mahal na Krus ng Wawa (Beloved Holy Cross of Wawa) is kept here.

The Feast of the Holy Cross of Wawa is a festival held on the first Sunday of July, observed in honor of the Holy Cross of Wawa (Mahal na Krus sa Wawa), a relic believed to have saved the life of an old woman drowning in the Bocaue River. The main feature of this fiesta is the Pagoda, a gaily decorated structure riding on a huge bangka, which glides along the town river carrying people from all walks of life.

Other religious denominations in the town include Iglesia ni Cristo, Jehovah's Witness, Methodist, Aglipayan, Adventist, Baptist, and the Church of Jesus Christ of Latter-day Saints. There are also a number of Evangelical, Pentecostal, Members Church of God International and Charismatic churches, ministries, fellowships, and groups in the municipality. Muslims are also found in the municipality.

Economy

Bocaue's town center is 27 kilometers north of Manila if reached via the North Luzon Expressway (NLEX) and the Bocaue Exit (in Barangay Turo). NLEX provides fast transport to Metro Manila from where it begins at Mabalacat, Pampanga, and Bocaue is the highway's middle route.

The town's major industry is fireworks-making, which has earned it the tag "Fireworks Capital of the Philippines". Among the prominent firecracker stores in Bocaue is Eat Bulaga Fireworks, owned by fireworks maker Rommel Eustaquio and named after the longest-running noontime variety program in the country.

Notable natives
Nationally known Bocaueños in the arts include choreographer Francisca Reyes Aquino, TV actress Jewel Mische, and contemporary painter Noli Principe Manalang. Lauro Delgado, a former veteran character actor of Premiere Productions from the early 1950s to the late 1970s, was born in Barangay Bunducan.

Sports and recreation
The Philippine Stadium, also known as the New Era University Stadium, is a sports stadium located inside the Ciudad de Victoria, a 75-hectare tourism enterprise zone located in the towns of Bocaue and Santa Maria, Bulacan. With a capacity of up to 25,000, it became the biggest stadium in the Philippines upon its completion.

The Philippine Arena, an indoor multi-purpose arena and the centerpiece of Ciudad de Victoria, is located just adjacent to the Philippine Stadium. With a seating capacity of 55,000 it became the largest indoor arena in the world upon its completion in 2014.

Education

Bocaue is also an education center for the Meycauayan, Marilao, Santa Maria, and Balagtas municipalities area. The state-owned Bulacan Polytechnic College has a campus in Bocaue. Private colleges and universities include the Dr. Yanga's Colleges and Jesus Is Lord Colleges Foundation Inc. New Era University and St. Paul University Quezon City also established branch campuses in the municipality. The municipality also has several elementary and secondary schools, both public and private.

Government

Sangguniang Bayan (2022–present) 

Municipal Councilors:

Mayors of Bocaue 
Mariano Ramirez (1900)
Gregorio de la Cruz (1901-1902)	
Vicente L. Enriquez (1902-1904)
Victor Pascual (1904-1905)
Lorenzo Galvez (1905-1907)
Mariano Reyes (1908-1909)
Dionisio Morales (1910-1912)
Victor Pascual (1913-1916)
Honorato Ramirez (1916-1919) 
Emiliano Eusebio (1919-1922)
Guillermo Mendoza (1922-1928)
Dominador L. Santos (1928-1933)
Gregorio de Guzman (1934-1935)
Emiliano Eusebio (1935-1937)
Dominador L. Santos (1938-1940)
Dioscoro M. Juan, Sr. (1940-1941) 
Manolito Vistan (1942-1944)
Joaquin San Juan (1944)
Dioscoro M. Juan, Sr. (1945-1948) 
Moises E. Nicolas (1948-1952) 
Evangelino Mendoza (1952-1956)
Dioscoro M. Juan, Sr. (1956-1960)
Moises E. Nicolas (1960-1965) 
Simeon Mauricio (1965-1972)
Matias B. Ramirez (1972-1979)
Zacarias G. del Rosario (1979-1986) 
Ranulfo David (1986)
Cesar N. Nicolas (1987-1988)
Lorenzo P. Gonzales (1988-1992)
Serafin M. de la Cruz (1992-1999)
Jose D.G. Santiago, Sr. (1999-2001)
Eduardo J. Villanueva, Jr. (2001-2004)
Serafin M. de la Cruz (2004-2007)
Eduardo J. Villanueva, Jr. (2007-2016)
Eleanor J. Villanueva-Tugna (June 30, 2016 – May 28, 2020)
Jose C. Santiago, Jr. (Acting mayor May 28, 2020-June 1, 2020, June 1, 2020 – June 30, 2022)
Eduardo J. Villanueva, Jr. (2022–present)

Vice Mayors of Bocaue 
Moises E. Nicolas (1956–1958)
Cesar N. Nicolas (1986–1988)
Serafin M. de la Cruz (1988-1992)
Mario Mendoza (1992-1995)
Antonio Mendoza (1995–1998)
Rogelio Ramos (1998–2001)
Peter Christopher Gonzales (2001–2004)
Kennedy Valdez (2004–2007)
Jose C. Santiago, Jr. (2007–2013)
Dioscoro Juan, Jr. (2013–2016)
Aldrin B. Sta. Ana (2016–2019)
Jose C. Santiago, Jr. (2019–2020)
Alvin Paul S.P. Cotaco (2020–2022)
Sherwin N. Tugna (2022–present)

Notable personalities
Francisca Reyes Aquino - choreographer and National Artist of the Philippines for Dance
Lauro Delgado - actor
Eddie Villanueva - evangelist and president-founder of Jesus Is Lord Church Worldwide; CIBAC party-list representative; and father of incumbent Philippine senator Emmanuel ("Joel"), incumbent Bocaue mayor Eduardo Jr. ("Jon-Jon") and former Bocaue mayor Eleanor ("Joni")
Joel Villanueva - incumbent Philippine senator
Billy Mamaril - basketball player
Jonjon Mendoza - 32nd Governor of Bulacan and former Bulacan 3rd district representative

Gallery

References

External links

 [ Philippine Standard Geographic Code]
Philippine Census Information
Bocaue Bulacan

Municipalities of Bulacan